Opuntia diploursina is a species in the family Cactaceae, that grows near and in Lake Mead National Recreation Area and northward across Nevada's Mormon Mesa, into Utah. This species is a close relative and probable ancestor of Opuntia erinacea, but "...differs in minor spines more closely appressed to pad surface, spines smaller in diameter and more flexible, inter-areolar distance less, upright growth habit, larger fruit with longer, more flexible spines, larger seeds, and diploid chromosome number (2n=22)".

Opuntia diploursina is also related to another diploid species, O. trichophora, but differs from that species, as stated in the original description, in more upright growth habit, more minor spines that are more closely appressed to pad surface, closer spaced areoles, often yellow spine color as opposed to white or gray mature spines;; more and longer spines on fruit. O. diploursina also has curling major spines, and larger fruit.  The two species are separated by hundreds of miles.

Opuntia diploursina (2n=22) is known to hybridize with O. basilaris (2n=22) wherever the species co-occur. This results in fertile progeny that can backcross with either parent eventually creating a hybrid swarm. The polyploid O. erinacea (2n=44) which is widely distributed in the Mojave and Great Basin deserts, is suspected to be a stabilized allopolyploid derived from O. diploursina and O. basilaris. Some O. diploursina x basilaris progeny resemble O. basilaris var. treleasei (2n=33), an endemic species of California.

References

External links
Opuntia diploursina description and photo gallery at Intermountain Region Herbarium Network
Opuntia diploursina description and photo gallery at SEINet Arizona – New Mexico Chapter
Opuntia diploursina photo gallery at Opuntia Web

diploursina
Cacti of the United States